Agromyces terreus is a Gram-positive and non-motile bacterium from the genus of Agromyces which has been isolated from soil from Dokdo in Korea.

References 

Microbacteriaceae
Bacteria described in 2008